Vladimir Gorbunov (born 22 April 1982) is a Russian former professional ice hockey player who played in the Kontinental Hockey League (KHL). He was selected by New York Islanders in the 4th round (105th overall) of the 2000 NHL Entry Draft.

Career statistics

References

External links

1982 births
Living people
Avtomobilist Yekaterinburg players
HC CSKA Moscow players
HC Dynamo Moscow players
HC MVD players
New York Islanders draft picks
Russian ice hockey forwards
Salavat Yulaev Ufa players
Ice hockey people from Moscow
THK Tver players
Torpedo Nizhny Novgorod players
HC Yugra players